is a TBS Japanese television drama, which stars Hideaki Takizawa and Ryo Nishikido. The series aired on July 24, 2009.

Plot synopsis
Ryuzaki Shinji who possesses a "God Hand", the power to heal wounds and illnesses just by touching the patient, is in fact a dark introvert who does not reveal his true self to others. Aoi Ryosuke who possesses the "Demon's Hand", the power to kill a person just by touching him, is as kind and pure as an angel. It is said when the demon meets the God, a fatal battle begins. Detective Hasebe Nagisa gets caught by the criminals during a deep cover operation. Ryosuke, a man she does not even know comes to save her and she witnesses his "Demon's Hand" in action. Thereafter she discovers by coincidence the existence of Shinji's "God Hand" and brings the two together. Little did she know that this would cause great disorder to the world and even to her own life.

Cast
Hideaki Takizawa as Shinji Ryūzaki
Ryo Nishikido as Ryōsuke Aoi
Asami Mizukawa as Nagisa Hasebe
Hikaru Yaotome as Masaru Kumakiri
Ryuji Yamamoto as Sōsuke Shibata
Natsuki Harada as Chiharu Maezono
Shugo Oshinari as Masato Yoshizumi
Haru as Kana Shirakawa
Toshio Shiba as Zenzō Kumakiri
Seiji Rokkaku as Ken Ninomiya
Kuranosuke Sasaki as Takayuki Sawamura
Atsuko Takahata as Yōko Sakaki

References

External links
Official website 

Kin'yō Dorama
2009 Japanese television series debuts
2009 Japanese television series endings